The 1990 Big League World Series took place from August 10–18 in Fort Lauderdale, Florida, United States. In a championship rematch, Taipei, Taiwan defeated Maracaibo, Venezuela in the championship game. It was Taiwan's fourth straight championship.

Teams

Results

References

Big League World Series
Big League World Series